Ronald Vuijk  (born 22 October 1965 in The Hague) is a Dutch politician. As a member of the People's Party for Freedom and Democracy (Volkspartij voor Vrijheid en Democratie) he was an MP between 8 November 2012 and 23 March 2017. Previously he was a municipal councillor of Delft from 2002 to 2005 and also from 2010 to 2011. In the meantime he was an alderman of this municipality. From 2011 to 2012, he was an alderman of the municipality of Midden-Delfland.

References 

1956 births
Living people
Members of the House of Representatives (Netherlands)
Municipal councillors of Delft
Aldermen in South Holland
People from Midden-Delfland
Politicians from The Hague
People's Party for Freedom and Democracy politicians
21st-century Dutch politicians